"Why's Everybody Always Pickin' on Me?" is the third single off the Bloodhound Gang's second album One Fierce Beer Coaster. The song samples "Spooky" by Classics IV and "Never Let Me Down Again" by Depeche Mode. The title is borrowed from the classic 1959 song "Charlie Brown" performed by The Coasters, in which a school troublemaker complains about being picked upon when his schemes backfire.

Music video
The music video starts out with Jimmy Pop in a psychiatrist's office. The doctor (whose name is Scott P. Nussenvy, a tongue-in-cheek reference to penis envy) proceeds to take Jimmy over to the couch and hypnotize him, in which Jimmy goes back over his horrible experience in high school and we see why he is the paranoid katagelophobic he is today. There are many tongue-in-cheek references to sex and drug use over the course of the video (they attend Wannagett High School, the homecoming queen is named Ivana Getchuharde, and the school's team is the Wannagett Beavers). The video shows Jimmy Pop's desperate attempts at trying to gain a little popularity, that fail miserably. He spends the whole of the video being picked on mainly by the other members of the band, until the bridge of the song where it is assumed that Jimmy has caused some sort of harm to, or possibly even killed the people who picked on him. After the bridge, we see the other four members of the band come into the psychiatrist's office, put Jimmy Pop in a straitjacket, put him in a wheelchair and throw him down the stairs. Jimmy has the last laugh: as the video freeze-frames the screen reads, "Jimmy's former classmates all suffered from hemorrhoids. Luckily for them, Jimmy went on to become a successful proctologist."

The video then fades to black, showing an "all persons fictitious" disclaimer ending with "...except the drummer from Def Leppard", who is referenced in the bridge.

Charts

References

Bloodhound Gang songs
1997 singles
1996 songs
Songs written by Jimmy Pop